Karima Begam, also Karima Begum, is a Nepali politician and a former state minister for Agriculture. She is currently a member of parliament in Province No. 2 state parliament.

Biography
On 20 November 2009, while still minister, she reportedly slapped the then Chief District Officer of Parsa in the Officer's office for failing to procure her a vehicle during her visit to the district. She was fined two thousand rupees for the crime in February 2018 by the district court of Parsa. In the 2013 elections, she ran for parliament from Parsa-1 constituency representing Madhesi Jana Adhikar Forum - Nepal but was defeated. In 2015, she was fined twenty thousand rupees by the Parsa District court for aiding an Indian national to unlawfully/fraudulently acquire a Nepalese citizenship certificate in 2007. In the 2017 election, she was elected to state parliament of Province No. 2 representing Samajbadi Party, Nepal through proportional representation system of election.

References

External Links 

21st-century Nepalese women politicians
21st-century Nepalese politicians
Year of birth missing (living people)
Living people
Madhesi people
Madhesi Jana Adhikar Forum, Nepal politicians
Samajbadi Prajatantrik Janata Party, Nepal politicians
Nepalese Muslims
Members of the Provincial Assembly of Madhesh Province

Members of the 1st Nepalese Constituent Assembly
People's Socialist Party, Nepal politicians